C.J. Obasi  (also known as "Fiery" or "The Fiery One") is a Nigerian film director, screenwriter and editor.

His debut feature – a zero budget film Ojuju premiered at the Africa International Film Festival in November 2014, and won the award for Best Nigerian Film. It also got him the Trailblazer of the Year award in March 2015, at the Africa Magic Viewers' Choice Awards.

Early life and career 
Born in the city of Owerri, Obasi grew up watching Hammer Horror films, reading Stephen King novels and watching film adaptations of his work. From the young age of 3, he would watch classic films and his favorite superheroes and villains; recreating them in hand-drawn comic books.

After attending the Government Secondary School, Owerri, Obasi studied computer science at the University of Nigeria. In 2012, he set up Fiery Film Company, with his wife, the TV and film producer, Oge Obasi and the late screenwriter Benjamin Stockton.

Obasi's directorial debut came in 2014 with Ojuju; a zombie thriller film. The movie was screened in various festivals around the world, including the Pan African Film Festival in Los Angeles, Shockproof Film Festival in Prague, New Voices in Black Film Festival in New York, Nollywood Week Festival in Paris, Fantasia Film Festival in Montreal, Africa International Film Festival where it won the award of the Best Nigerian Film and others; garnering universal acclaim from the likes of internationally renowned critics such as Todd Brown of Twitch Film, Tambay A. Obenson of Shadow and Act, and Frank Scheck of The Hollywood Reporter. Remarkably, Ojuju is a zero budget movie.

His second film, O-Town, was released in 2015 to even more critical acclaim. A crime thriller, O-Town, also written by Obasi, tells the tale of a small town mired in crime. O-Town was inspired by Owerri, the place where Obasi was born.

In 2018, Obasi directed the film adaptation of Nnedi Okorafor's africanfuturistic short story "Hello, Moto". The short film, Hello, Rain, stars Keira Hewatch as Rain, a scientist and witch. In February 2017, Fiery Film Production optioned the short story and began production.

It had its world premiere at the International Short Film Festival Oberhausen, on 6 May 2018.

Future projects

In 2016, C.J. announced an upcoming movie titled Mami Wata; based on the popular African folklore on water spirits. The director started a crowdfunding campaign on Indiegogo to raise the sum of $120,000, in anticipation of a likely fall 2018 principal photography start date. The budget was to cover production and post production costs. Mami Wata was shot in black and white. It was selected for the 2023 Sundance Film Festival, and premiers January 23, 2022.

Filmography

References

Living people
Nigerian film directors
Year of birth missing (living people)
University of Nigeria alumni
People from Owerri
AMVCA Trailblazer Award winners
Nigerian screenwriters
Africa Magic Viewers' Choice Awards winners